Notonemouridae is a family of stoneflies in the order Plecoptera. There are more than 20 genera and at least 120 described species in Notonemouridae.

Genera
These 23 genera belong to the family Notonemouridae:

 Afronemoura Illies, 1981
 Aphanicerca Tillyard, 1931
 Aphanicercella Tillyard, 1931
 Aphanicercopsis Barnard, 1934
 Austrocerca Illies, 1975
 Austrocercella Illies, 1975
 Austrocercoides Illies, 1975
 Austronemoura Aubert, 1960
 Balinskycercella Stevens & Picker, 1995
 Cristaperla McLellan, 1972
 Desmonemoura Tillyard, 1931
 Kimminsoperla Illies, 1961
 Madenemura Paulian, 1949
 Neofulla Claassen, 1936
 Neonemura Navás, 1919
 Notonemoura Tillyard, 1923
 Omanuperla McLellan, 1972
 Otehiwi McLellan, 2003
 Spaniocerca Tillyard, 1923
 Spaniocercoides Kimmins, 1938
 Tasmanocerca Illies, 1975
 Udamocercia Enderlein, 1909
 Halticoperla McLellan & Winterbourn, 1968

Extinct genera 

 †Paranotonemoura Cui and Béthoux 2018 Togo-Khuduk Formation, Mongolia, Middle Jurassic (Bajocian/Bathonian), Daohugou, China, Middle/Late Jurassic

References

Further reading

 
 
 
 
 

Plecoptera
Plecoptera families